Diptychocarpus is a genus of flowering plants belonging to the family Brassicaceae.

Its native range is Eastern Europe to Western Himalaya and Northern China.

Species:
 Diptychocarpus strictus (Fisch. ex M.Bieb.) Trautv.

References

Brassicaceae
Brassicaceae genera